Yajamana is a 2019 Indian Kannada-language social action film written and directed by V. Harikrishna and Pon Kumaran and produced by Shylaja Nag and B. Suresha. It stars Darshan, Rashmika Mandanna and Tanya Hope in lead roles. It also features an ensemble cast of Thakur Anoop Singh, Devaraj, P. Ravi Shankar, Dhananjay in key supporting roles. The film's background score and soundtrack is also composed by V. Harikrishna.

Yajamana was released on 1 March 2019 and received mixed-to-positive reviews from critics. The film completed 100 days in theatres and emerged as commercially successful film at the box office.

Plot
Devi Shetty is an oil trader/businessman, who controls the oil business with the help of his related oil mafia contacts in Mumbai. He asks for coordinates about a village Hulidurga which has not entailed in the oil market. Hulidurga is maintained by chieftain Hulikar Nayaka's daughter Kaveri's love interest Krishna, who is the protector of the village's oil mill. One day, Devi Shetty arrives at the village to convince the villagers of entitling its co-operation in his oil marketing. A reporter Ganga covers the news, broadcasting the same. 

Krishna opposes and warns the people of Devi Shetty's plan to infiltrate and plunder all the oil resources of the village and that they were bound to lose everything, if they were to pledge co-operation. Krishna also warns Devi Shetty not to take anything from Hulidurga, thereby insulting him. The news gets telecast all throughout where Devi Shetty plans to avenge the insults from Krishna by the aid of Krishna's rival Mittai Suri, who successfully deceives the village and its people from him. Devi Shetty's men capture Krishna and try to kill him, but Krishna fights them off and warns Devi Shetty that he will arrive in Mumbai and bring down his oil profits. Krishna arrives in Mumbai where he stays in Ganga's grandfather's house. Krishna with the help of the oil owners, starts to sell oil. 

However, Krishna faces obstacles where he must even fend off a few men in the market, but eventually consumers start buying his oil brand acknowledging his oil to be the best. Krishna succeeds in the oil market. In Hulidurga, all the people began to lose the market price for their products and started to commit suicide. Kaveri arrives to meet Krishna in Mumbai where she reveals all the incidents to him. Kaveri plans to approach Devi Shetty asking help for the sake of the village where Krishna joins her and meets Devi Shetty and pretends to apologise on behalf of his people. Devi Shetty reveals it to the people on video conference. Krishna reveals that when people stopped the oil mill, people will start the oil mill again and they will get back what they were losing. All people recall their oil mill by his words and insults Devi Shetty. 

Krishna excels in the oil market and later leaves for the village to get the marketing rights from the Huliyappa and starts selling oil in the market where he names his brand as Nandhi Oil Brand. Devi Shetty befalls a loss in the market.  Pulla Reddy, his supporter arrives to meet Krishna in the name of an ally, to put an end to Devi Shetty. Devi Shetty hatches a vice plan and Krishna gets arrested by police on the grounds of stocking illegal oil. In the court, Krishna proves his innocence by revealing that all of oil stocks are actually owned by Devi Shetty. Krishna had took some brands unknowingly from Pulla Reddy and draws the brand's name stamp on those where he asks the judge to scratch the brand with a coin which reveals them to be those of Devi Shetty's and also reveals, much to his happiness that Nandhi Brand is also used at the courtroom's canteen. 

The Judge sends Devi Shetty's brand for testing at the lab only to find it chemically hazardous. The court orders Devi Shetty to be taken into custody and also orders to seize his brand in the market and the company suffers from major downfall whereas, Krishna is released from custody after proving his innocence. Devi Shetty targets Krishna and his family, but Krishna sends them away to a safe place. Devi Shetty sends Pulla Reddy to snatch the documents (which contains the illegal oil business orchested by Devi Shetty and Pulla Reddy), but to no avail. 

Unfortunately, Hulikar and Kaveri are caught by Devi Shetty and Hulikar was given rat poison and dies minutes later, after revealing everything to Krishna. Krishna arrives at Devi Shetty's oil godown where he defeats him and during the fight, the place is set ablaze on fire and Devi Shetty is burnt alive and Krishna becomes the main oil trader in Mumbai and starts to produce oil from Hulidurga.

Cast

Darshan as Krishna
Rashmika Mandanna as Kaveri
Tanya Hope as Ganga
Devaraj as Gurikar Huliyappa Nayaka
Ravishankar as Pulla Reddy
Thakur Anoop Singh as Devi Shetty
Sadhu Kokila as Captain jaganmohan , a Cook in Mumbai
H. G. Dattatreya as Hegde
Mandya Ramesh as Kashi
Hithesh as a worker 
P D Sathishchandra as a worker
Shivaraj KR Pete as a worker
Sanju Basayya as Krishna's friend
Malathishree mysuru as Krishna's grandmother
Radha Ramachandra as Kaveri's grandmother
Yaseen Nadaf as Kaveri's brother
Suchithra as Huliyappa Nayak's wife
Srinivas Prabhu as Judge
Jahangir
Shankar ashwath
Manjunatha Hedge
Yashwanth Shetty
Dhananjay as Mittayi Soori in Cameo Appearance
Prajwal Devaraj (Special appearance in "Shivanandi")
Prem (Special appearance in "Shivanandi")
Vinod Prabhakar (Special appearance in "Shivanandi")
Sharan (Special appearance in "Shivanandi")
Chiranjeevi Sarja (Special appearance in "Shivanandi")
Vineeth Darshan (Special appearance in "Shivanandi")

Vajrang Shetty

Release
Yajamana was released on March 1, 2019 across more than 600 Silver screens world wide only in Kannada language. It was released covering more than 495 theatres in Karnataka alone and hit 50+ screens in other states of India on 1 March 2019.

The release date of Yajamana in United States and Canada was postponed to 8 March 2019. It was released across 55 theatres in USA and 3 theatres in Canada by Weekend cinema distributors.

Soundtrack

Accolades

Reception

Critical response 

Sunayana Suresh of The Times of India gave the film a rating of 3/5 and wrote "Yajamana is definitely a must-watch for fans of commercial cinema. It has all the necessary masala and also manages to slip in a message towards the end of the film." A Shardhha From  The New Indian Express wrote "Yajamana does put in a serious thought on globalisation and monopoly, and comes out with both mass and class elements, holding good for all kinds of audience." SHASHIPRASAD S.M of Deccan Chronicle wrote "Along with the oil, Yajamana is mixed well with a short love story, in which Rashmika as Kaveri is paired opposite Darshan and the rest of it garnished with comedy and loads of action in addition to challenging dialogues." Aravind Shwetha of The News Minute gave the film a rating of 3/5 and wrote "The movie is predictable but that can be overlooked as it is a strong family entertainer with the necessary commercial elements."News18 Kannada wrote "V. Harikrishna and P. The film is directed by Kumar. Suresh and Shailaja Nag are investing. Rashmika Mandanna and Tanya Hope have appeared alongside Darshan. Anoop Thakur Singh is a villain in this film. Dhananjay plays the lead role in the film."

References

External links

2010s Kannada-language films
Indian action films
Films shot in Bangalore
2019 masala films
Films directed by Pon Kumaran
2019 action films